Lavar (also Romanized as Lāvār; also known as Lāvār Kesh) is a village in Deylaman Rural District, Deylaman District, Siahkal County, Gilan Province, Iran. At the 2006 census, its population was 14, in 4 families.

References 

Populated places in Siahkal County